Margarita, Armando y su padre is a 1939  Argentine romantic comedy film directed by Francisco Múgica. The film is based a play by Enrique Jardiel Poncela who himself adapted the film for the silver screen. The film premiered in Buenos Aires and starred Mecha Ortiz and Pedro Quartucci.
Production design of the film was performed by Ricardo J. Conord.

Overview 
The film produces a revival of the famous play, treating its characters in an ironical way.

Cast 
 Florencio Parravicini ...  Spaghetti - Armando's father
 Mecha Ortiz ...  Margarita
 Ernesto Raquén ...  Armando
 María Santos ...  Julia
 Pedro Quartucci ...  Antonito
 Carmen Lamas ...  Flora
 Alita Román ...  Cristina
 Enrique Roldán ...  Ernesto Landaluce
 Héctor Quintanilla ...  Caballo de Atila
 Alfredo Jordan ...  Manolo
 Alfonso Pisano ...  Ceferino
 Susy Derqui ...  Luz de Bengala
 Hilda Sour ...  Cameo
 Olga Mon ...  Rosita
 Liana Moabro...  Maruja
 José Alfayate ...  Román
 Berta Aliana ...  Mucama
 Lalo Bouhier ...  Vendedor
 Cayetano Biondo ...  Mozo
 J. Armando Chamot ...  Maitre
 Cirilo Etulain

External links 
 

1939 films
1930s Spanish-language films
Argentine black-and-white films
1939 romantic comedy films
Argentine romantic comedy films
Films directed by Francisco Múgica
1930s Argentine films